Dangerous Drives is a documentary television series broadcast on Speed. The series first aired on Speed in the United States on November 26, 2009.

Episodes

References

External links
 Dangerous Drives, episodes and clips online
 

2009 American television series debuts
2010s American documentary television series